The University of the Chinese Academy of Sciences (UCAS) is a public research university in Beijing, China, under the direct leadership of the Chinese Academy of Sciences (CAS). Renamed in 2012, UCAS was founded as the Graduate School of the Chinese Academy of Sciences in 1978 by the approval of the State Council as the first graduate school in China. 

UCAS produced the first doctoral graduate in science, the first doctoral graduate in engineering, the first female doctoral graduate and the first graduate with double doctoral degrees in China. In 2014, UCAS began to recruit undergraduates. It is a Chinese state Double First Class University. UCAS is a member of the Association of Pacific Rim Universities (APRU). UCAS has also founded a Kavli Institute for Theoretical Sciences (KITS), one of the 20 Kavli institutes across the world.

UCAS ranked 1st globally in Nature Index 2021 Young Universities in Leading 150 Young Universities  and ranked 18th in NTU Rankings 2019 which is 1st in China,. Regarding scientific research output, the Nature Index 2022 ranked UCAS 1st in China and the Asia Pacific region, and 4th in the world among the global universities (Only after Harvard, Stanford, and MIT).

UCAS also ranked 63rd in CWUR World University Rankings 2022-2023, placing it 3rd in China only after Tsinghua University and Peking University, and ranked 71-80th in Times Higher Education World Reputation Rankings, placing it 8th in China.

History

In 1978, the Graduate School of the University of Science and Technology of China (USTC) was founded in Beijing, as the first graduate school in China.

In 1986, the Graduate School of USTC was renamed Graduate School (Beijing) of USTC, while USTC established a new Graduate School in Hefei, Anhui province.

In 2000, the Graduate School (Beijing) of USTC was renamed Graduate School of the Chinese Academy of Sciences (GSCAS).

In 2005, GSCAS was renamed Graduate University of the Chinese Academy of Sciences (GUCAS).

In 2012, GUCAS was renamed University of the Chinese Academy of Sciences (UCAS).

In 2014, UCAS began to recruit undergraduates.

On November 7, 2014, the University of Chinese Academy of Sciences officially participated in the activities of the C9 League, an alliance of elite Chinese universities offering comprehensive and leading education. However, it was not an official member.

Academics

Academic organisation
 School of Mathematical Sciences
 School of Physics
 School of Astronomy and Space Science
 College of Engineering Science
 School of Artificial Intelligence
 School of Chemistry and Chemical Engineering
 College of Materials Science and Opto-Electronic Technology
 College of Earth and Planetary Sciences
 College of Resources and Environment
 College of Life Sciences
 Savaid Medical School
 School of Computer Science and Technology
 School of Cyber Security
 School of Electronic, Electric and Communication Engineering
 School of Microelectronics
 School of Economics and Management
 School of Public Policy and Management
 College of Humanities and Social Sciences
 Department of Foreign Languages
 Sino-Danish College / Sino-Danish Center for Education and Research
 International College
 Kavli Institute for Theoretical Sciences
 Research Center on Fictitious Economy and Data Science
 CAS Key Laboratory of Big Data Mining and Knowledge Management
 CAS Key Laboratory of Computational Geodynamics
 Center of Architecture Research and Design
 Research Center for Innovation Method
 Training Center
 Tsung-Dao Lee Center of Sciences and Arts

Institutions

Founded in 1978, UCAS is the first graduate school in China with the ratification of the State Council. Backed by more than 110 institutes of the CAS, which are located at more than 20 cities all over the country, UCAS is headquartered in Beijing with 4 campuses, and 5 branches in Shanghai, Chengdu, Wuhan, Guangzhou and Lanzhou. From UCAS, graduated China's first doctoral student in science, first doctoral student in engineering, first female doctoral student and first student with double doctoral degrees in China. On the 20th anniversary of UCAS in 1998, Chinese President and General Secretary of the Communist Party Jiang Zemin of the People's Republic of China wrote this inscription for the University: "Revitalizing China through science and education, and emphasizing the cultivation and nurturing of talented people." By 2004, 50,000 graduate students had graduated from UCAS, among whom there are nearly 20,000 PhD. students.

UCAS offers programs in nine major academic fields: science, engineering, agriculture, medicine, philosophy, economics, literature, linguistics, education and management science. The university is authorized to grant advanced degrees in 26 primary academic disciplines which include master's degree conferring rights in 130 secondary disciplines, and Doctoral degree rights in 114 secondary disciplines.

UCAS was the first university in China to start the master's degree program in English Applied Linguistics (with reference to TESOL in foreign countries). Since 1978, the program has educated more than 100 English teachers who are now working at various universities and graduate schools. UCAS has the leading position in English teaching and researching in China. Back in 1993, there were four teachers, who were also the UCAS graduates, joined the national team to set up China's first English Curriculum for Non-English Majored MS and PhD Students, issued by Chinese Commission of Education and published by Chongqing University Press.

The faculty of the university is composed of over 300 members of the Chinese Academy of Sciences and/or the Chinese Academy of Engineering.

UCAS offers "General Scholarship for Graduate Students", "CAS Scholarship", "CAS President Scholarship" and various other sponsored scholarships. The financial aid system of "research assistantship", "administration assistantship" and "teaching assistantship" has been put into practice in UCAS.

At present, with annual enrolments of more than 10,000 students, UCAS has over 30,000 ongoing students, among whom 51% are PhD students.

UCAS offers programs for international students and students from Hong Kong, Macao and Taiwan. It also provides financial aid for these students by setting up "UCAS International Students Scholarship" and "UCAS Scholarship for Students from Hong Kong, Macao and Taiwan".

Rankings and reputation 

UCAS is included in the Double First-Class University Plan designed by the central government of China. UCAS ranked 63rd in CWUR World University Rankings 2022-2023, placing it 3rd in China only after Tsinghua University and Peking University. UCAS is ranked 18th in NTU Rankings 2019, placing it 1st in China.

Regarding scientific research output, the Nature Index 2022 ranks UCAS the No.1 university in China and the Asia Pacific region, and 4th in the world among the global universities (after Harvard, Stanford, and MIT).

UCAS ranks 21st globally, 15th in Asia, and 14th in the mainland China according to the CWTS Leiden Ranking 2022 based on the number of their scientific publications in the period 2017–2020.

As of 2022, UCAS is ranked 112th globally,16th in Asia and 7th in China by the U.S. News & World Report Best Global University Ranking, with its "Artificial Intelligence", "Agricultural Science", "Biology and Biochemistry", "Biotechnology and Applied Microbiology", "Cell Biology", "Chemical Engineering", "Chemistry", "Civil Engineering", "Computer Science", "Condensed Matter Physics", "Electrical and Electronic Engineering", "Energy and Fuels", "Engineering", "Environment/Ecology", "Food Science and Technology", "Geoscience", "Material Science", "Mechanical Engineering", "Meteorology and Atmospheric Sciences", "Microbiology", "Molecular Biology and Genetics", "Nanoscience and Nanotechnology", "Optics", "Pharmacology and Toxicology", "Physical Chemistry", "Physics", "Plant and animal science", "Polymer Science" and "Water resource"  subjects, placed in the global top 100.

Internationally, UCAS was regarded as one of the most reputable Chinese universities by the Times Higher Education World Reputation Rankings where, it ranked 71-80th globally.

UCAS faculty are all based upon the research professors in the Chinese Academy of Sciences, which has been consistently ranked the No. 1 research institute in the world by Nature Index since the list's inception in 2014, by Nature Research. This makes UCAS arguably the best graduate school in China and one of the best in the world.

Nature Index 
Nature Index tracks the affiliations of high-quality scientific articles and presents research outputs by institution and country on monthly basis.

Students
Even though UCAS mainly caters to graduate education, the university started enrolling undergraduate students in 2014. In 2015, there are 44,464 graduate students and 664 undergraduates students attend the academy.

UCAS, through its various departments and research institutes of the CAS across the country, offers the following programs to foreign students in a wide range of specialties and research fields: Master Program, PhD. Program, Program for Regular Visiting Students, and Program for Senior Visiting Students.

Asteroid 
Asteroid 189018 Guokeda was named in honor of the university. The official  was published by the Minor Planet Center on 25 September 2018.

Global partner institutions

Europe

Denmark
Sino-Danish Center for Education and Research
Technical University of Denmark
University of Copenhagen
Aarhus University
Aalborg University
University of Southern Denmark
Roskilde University
IT University of Copenhagen
Copenhagen Business School

Southeast Asia

Malaysia
Universiti Tunku Abdul Rahman

See also
 University of Science and Technology of China
 ShanghaiTech University
 University of Chinese Academy of Social Sciences
 Science and technology in China
 List of universities and colleges in Beijing
 List of universities in China

References 
 

University of the Chinese Academy of Sciences
1978 establishments in China
Chinese Academy of Sciences
Educational institutions established in 1978
Universities and colleges in Beijing
[[Category:Vice-ministerial universities in China]